Tom and Jerry: The Chuck Jones Collection is a two-disc DVD collection of animated short cartoons starring Tom and Jerry, produced by Chuck Jones, released by Warner Home Video on June 23, 2009, in the US and September 21, 2009, in the UK. These are the same 34 cartoons that appear on European DVD collection in PAL format, Tom and Jerry: The Classic Collection - Volume 6 (dual format or disc 11 or 12 in single side format).
All 34 of the Chuck Jones Tom and Jerry shorts are included, along with two new documentaries. 
All versions of this set (including the Region 2 version) are shown in matted 1.75:1 widescreen, as shown in theatres, unlike the Classic collection which present the shorts in filmed academy ratio of 1.37:1.

Disc 1

1963 
 01 Pent-House Mouse

1964 
 02 The Cat Above and the Mouse Below
 03 Is There a Doctor in the Mouse?
 04 Much Ado About Mousing
 05 Snowbody Loves Me
 06 The Unshrinkable Jerry Mouse

1965 
 07 Ah, Sweet Mouse-Story of Life
 08 Tom-ic Energy
 09 Bad Day at Cat Rock
 10 The Brothers Carry-Mouse-Off
 11 Haunted Mouse
 12 I'm Just Wild About Jerry
 13 Of Feline Bondage
 14 The Year of the Mouse
 15 The Cat's Me-Ouch

1966 
 16 Duel Personality
 17 Jerry, Jerry, Quite Contrary

Disc 2

1966 
 18 Jerry-Go-Round
 19 Love Me, Love My Mouse
 20 Puss 'n' Boats
 21 Filet Meow
 22 Matinee Mouse
 23 The A-Tom-inable Snowman
 24 Catty-Cornered

1967 
 25 Cat and Dupli-cat
 26 O-Solar Meow
 27 Guided Mouse-ille
 28 Rock 'n' Rodent
 29 Cannery Rodent
 30 The Mouse from H.U.N.G.E.R.
 31 Surf-Bored Cat
 32 Shutter Bugged Cat
 33 Advance and Be Mechanized
 34 Purr-Chance to Dream

Bonus Features 
 Tom and Jerry...and Chuck
 Chuck Jones: Memories of Childhood, by Peggy Stern and John Canemaker

Television videos and DVDs
Tom and Jerry